Ali Akbar (also Romanized as ‘Alī Akbar; also known as Alīavar) is a village in Dorudfaraman Rural District, in the Central District of Kermanshah County, Kermanshah Province, Iran. At the 2006 census, its population was 269, in 61 families.

References 

Populated places in Kermanshah County